Marcel Klinge (born 4 December 1980) is a German politician of the Free Democratic Party (FDP) who served as a member of the Bundestag from the state of Baden-Württemberg from 2017 until 2021.

Life 
In 2012, Klinge received his doctorate on "Islam and Integration Policy of German Federal Governments after September 11, 2001" at the Humboldt University of Berlin. There he studied politics and sociology from 2002 to 2007 and graduated with a master's degree in social sciences. Klinge joined the FDP in 2001. 

Klinge became member of the Bundestag after the 2017 German federal election. He was a member of the Committee for Economy and Energy and the Committee for Tourism. He was spokesman for tourism policy of the FDP parliamentary group in the Bundestag.

He lost his seat at the 2021 German federal election.

References

External links 

  
 Bundestag biography 
 

 

1980 births
Living people
People from Apolda
Members of the Bundestag for Baden-Württemberg
Members of the Bundestag 2017–2021
Members of the Bundestag for the Free Democratic Party (Germany)